Charles Pagnoccolo (born 25 March 1951) is a former Australian rules footballer who played with Footscray and Melbourne in the Victorian Football League (VFL).

Notes

External links 

Charlie Pagnoccolo's playing statistics from The VFA Project

1951 births
Living people
Australian rules footballers from Victoria (Australia)
Western Bulldogs players
Melbourne Football Club players
Oakleigh Football Club players
Mordialloc Football Club players